Giamal Biscia is a village in western Eritrea. It is located in the Omhajer Subregion of the Gash-Barka region. It lies inside the Gash-Setit wildlife reserve 6 kilometres north-east of Arcugi.

As the name may suggest, the village was founded by the Italians during the occupation.

Villages in Eritrea